Sir David Norman Reddaway  (born 26 April 1953) is Chief Executive and Clerk of the Goldsmiths' Company in the City of London. He is a retired British diplomat who was High Commissioner to Canada and Ambassador to Ireland and Turkey.

Career

Reddaway was born in Ottawa, Ontario, Canada, where his father, Norman Reddaway, also a British diplomat, was posted at the time. He attended King's College School, Cambridge and Oundle School, then studied History at Fitzwilliam College, Cambridge, where his grandfather, the historian William Fiddian Reddaway, had served as Censor. He joined the Foreign and Commonwealth Office in 1975. His career has included assignments to Iran (during the Iranian revolution), India, Spain, Argentina and Afghanistan.

In 2002, his appointment as British ambassador to Iran was rejected by the Iranian government, with some Iranian newspapers incorrectly accusing him of being "a Jew and a member of MI6". He speaks fluent Persian.

He served as High Commissioner to Canada between 2003 and 2006. In 2006 he was appointed the British Ambassador to Ireland and presented his diplomatic credentials to the President of Ireland, Mary McAleese on 12 September 2006, succeeding Stewart Eldon as the ambassador.

He was appointed to Turkey in 2009, and left Ankara in January 2014.

Reddaway was appointed MBE in the Queen's Birthday Honours of 1980, CMG in 1993, and knighted KCMG in the 2013 Birthday Honours "for services to British diplomacy and furthering UK interests in Turkey".

Reddaway had the honour of celebrating his 64th birthday at a Chris de Burgh concert.  De Burgh announced Sir David's birthday to a packed audience at the London Palladium on April 26, 2017, and gave a brief account of his role as a diplomat.  He then sang the Beatles song 'When I'm 64.'

Personal 
David Reddaway married Roshan Firouz in the late summer of 1981, thereby gaining Louise Firouz as his mother in law.  The marriage was followed by the births of the couple's two sons and one daughter.  David remarried, to Gabrielle Claire O’Driscoll, in March, 2020.

Career

1975–1977: Foreign and Commonwealth Office Desk Officer for East Germany and the Council of Europe
1977–1980: Tehran: 3rd Secretary Commercial; 2nd later 1st Secretary Political
1980–1984: Madrid, 1st Secretary Political
1984–1986: Foreign and Commonwealth Office: Falkland Islands Department, Desk Officer
1986–1988: Foreign and Commonwealth Office: Private Secretary to Minister(s) of State
1988–1990: New Delhi, 1st Secretary Political
1990–1993: Tehran, chargé d'affaires
1993–1997: Buenos Aires, Minister & Deputy Head of Mission
1997–1999: FCO: Head of Southern European Department
1999–2001: FCO: Director Public Services
2002–2002: London, UK Special Representative for Afghanistan
2002–2003: Harvard, Visiting Fellow
2003–2006: Ottawa, High Commissioner
2006–2009: Dublin, Ambassador
2009–2014: Ankara, Ambassador
2015–2022: Clerk, Goldsmith Company

Arms

Notes

References

External links
The British Embassy in Turkey Career history — biography from the British Embassy's website
Britain’s new man in Ireland — Sunday Business Post interview, 17 September 2006
A high-flying veteran diplomat — BBC News article, 8 February 2002
REDDAWAY, Sir David (Norman), Who's Who 2014, A & C Black, 2014; online edn, Oxford University Press, Dec 2013

Living people
1953 births
People educated at Oundle School
Alumni of Fitzwilliam College, Cambridge
Harvard Fellows
Members of HM Diplomatic Service
High Commissioners of the United Kingdom to Canada
Ambassadors of the United Kingdom to Ireland
Ambassadors of the United Kingdom to Turkey
Knights Commander of the Order of St Michael and St George
Members of the Order of the British Empire
20th-century British diplomats
21st-century British diplomats